Just a Dream may refer to:

 "Just a Dream" (Carrie Underwood song), 2008
 "Just a Dream" (Donna de Lory song), 1993
 "Just a Dream" (Jimmy Clanton song), 1958
 "Just a Dream" (Nelly song), 2010
 "Just a Dream", a song by Nena from 99 Luftballons
 "Just a Dream (On My Mind)", a 1939 song by Big Bill Broonzy
 Just a Dream - 22 Dreams Live, a live album by Paul Weller
 Just a Dream, a 2002 film starring Jeremy Sumpter
 Just a Dream, a 1990 children's book by Chris Van Allsburg

See also
 "Just Dream", a 2007 song by Carol Decker
 Only a Dream (disambiguation)